Laphria ventralis is a species of robber flies in the family Asilidae.

References

ventralis
Articles created by Qbugbot
Insects described in 1885
Taxa named by Samuel Wendell Williston